Henry Beardmore (7 February 1863 – 29 August 1932) was an Australian politician.

He was born in Melton to butcher Edwin James Beardmore and Flora McDonald. He grew up in Benalla and became a butcher at Glenrowan before becoming a farmer near Wodonga. On 15 July 1885 he married Agnes Annie Lee, with whom he had four children; she died in 1892, and on 23 August 1893 he married Jessie Muirhead, with whom he had a further ten children. He served on Wodonga Shire Council from 1898 to 1922, with four terms as president (1900–01, 1908–10, 1911–12, 1914–17). In 1917 he won a by-election for the Victorian Legislative Assembly seat of Benambra; he was associated with the Economy Party and more broadly with the Nationalists. From March to July 1924 he was a minister without portfolio, a position he held again from June to December 1929. He was Minister of Railways, Electrical Undertakings and Labour for two days in December 1929. Beardmore remained in the Assembly until his death in Wodonga in 1932.

References

1863 births
1932 deaths
Nationalist Party of Australia members of the Parliament of Victoria
United Australia Party members of the Parliament of Victoria
Members of the Victorian Legislative Assembly